Hude is a railway station located in Hude, Germany. The station is located on the Oldenburg–Bremen railway. The train services are operated by Deutsche Bahn and NordWestBahn. The station has been part of the Bremen S-Bahn since December 2010.

Train services
The following services currently call at the station:

Regional services  Norddeich - Emden - Oldenburg - Bremen - Nienburg - Hanover
Bremen S-Bahn services  Bad Zwischenahn - Oldenburg - Delmenhorst - Bremen
Bremen S-Bahn services  Nordenham - Hude - Delmenhorst - Bremen

References

Railway stations in Lower Saxony
Bremen S-Bahn